Tripolis on the Meander (Eth.) – also Neapolis, Apollonia, and Antoniopolis (Greek: Αντωνιόπολις)– was an ancient city on the borders of Phrygia, Caria and Lydia, on the northern bank of the upper course of the Maeander, and on the road leading from Sardes by Philadelphia to Laodicea ad Lycum. (It. Ant. p. 336; Tab. Peut.) It was situated 20 km to the northwest of Hierapolis.

Ruins of it still exist near Yenicekent (formerly Yeniji or Kash Yeniji), a township in the Buldan district of Denizli Province, Turkey. (Arundell, Seven Churches, p. 245; Hamilton, Researches, i. p. 525; Fellows, Asia Minor, p. 287.)  The ruins mostly date from the Roman and Byzantine periods and include a theater, baths, city walls, and a necropolis. An ancient church, dating back 1,500 years, has been unearthed in 2013.

Province 

The earliest mention of Tripolis is by Pliny (v. 30), who treats it as a Lydian town. Ptolemy (v. 2. § 18) and Stephanus of Byzantium describe it as a Carian town. Hierocles (p. 669) likewise calls it a Lydian town.

William Mitchell Ramsay also places Tripolis within Lydia.

The city minted coins in antiquity, some of which bore an image of Leto. Catalogues of coins of Tripolis generally refer to the city as belonging to Lydia. However, one book on coin collecting list Tripolis as part of Lydia on one page, but speaks of it as part of Caria on another.

A website on which various contributors give news of Turkish archaeology treats Tripolis as part of Phrygia.

Other names 

Pliny says the city was also called Apollonia (Ἀπολλωνία), and Stephanus of Byzantium that, in his time, it was called Neapolis (Νεάπολις).

Bishopric 
The city of Tripolis was the seat of an ancient bishopric, suffragan to Sardis. Very little is known of the Bishopric, but we retain the names of some bishops, including: 
Ramsay reports that a bishop of Tripolis in Lydia named Agogius attended the First Council of Nicaea in 325. 
Leontius
Commodus at Council of Chalcedon. and Ephesus
Paulus, fl.451.
Joannes, fl 451
Anastasius
Sisinnius

The see is included in the Catholic Church's list of titular sees, which treats it as part of the late Roman province of Lydia.
Nicolas Fryes de Brisaco, (21 Jun 1456 Appointed – 17 Jul 1498)

See also
List of Ancient Greek cities

References

External links
 Tripolis ad Maeandrum archaeological project website
 "Tripolis" at the Turkish Ministry of Culture
 Hazlitt, Classical Gazetteer, "Tripolis"
 Tripolis site description and photo gallery at Turkish Archaeological News

Buldan District
Archaeological sites in the Aegean Region
Populated places in ancient Caria
Populated places in ancient Lydia
Populated places in Phrygia
Ancient Greek archaeological sites in Turkey
Roman sites in Turkey
Catholic titular sees in Asia
History of Denizli Province
Buildings and structures in Denizli Province
Tourist attractions in Denizli Province
Former populated places in Turkey